Melfi is a city in Basilicata, Italy.

Melfi may also refer to:

People
 Corrado Melfi, an Italian historian and archaeologist
 Giuseppe Melfi, an Italo-Swiss mathematician
 John Melfi, a United States–based television and movie producer
 Leonard Melfi, an American playwright and actor
 Mary Melfi, a Canadian writer 
 Theodore Melfi, an American screenwriter, film director, and producer

Toponyms
 Melfi, Chad

Other
 Melfi Family, a family that ruled Melfi as Dukes and obtained other titles in the south of Italy
 Jennifer Melfi, a fictional character on the American television drama series The Sopranos
 The Prince of Melfi, an Italian noble title

MELFI may refer to:
 Minus Eighty Degree Laboratory Freezer for ISS